This article provides an overview of the transport infrastructure of Latvia.

Road system 

It is mandatory to keep headlights on while driving, even in daylight; most cars commercially sold in Latvia are equipped to make this automatic.

Highways

Length of the road system

Railways 

 
Latvian Railways is the main state-owned railway company in Latvia. Its daughter companies both carry out passengers services as well as carry a large quantity of freight cargo, and freight trains operate over the whole current passenger network, and a number of lines currently closed to passenger services.

There is also a narrow gauge railway between Gulbene and Aluksne, operated by the Industrial Heritage Trust, using Russian and Polish built heritage rolling stock. Three narrow gauge trains a day operate on the 33 km route between the two towns.

total:
2,347 km 
Russian gauge:
2,314 km  gauge (270 km electrified) 
narrow gauge:
33 km  gauge (2002)

Passenger Train 

Pasažieru Vilciens is a daughter company of Latvian Railways and the only passenger-carrying company in Latvia.

Domestic passenger lines with current service are:
 Torņakalns – Tukums II Railway
 Riga – Jelgava Railway
 Jelgava – Liepāja Railway
 Riga – Daugavpils Railway
 Krustpils – Rēzekne – Zilupe (border of Russia)
 Rīga – Sigulda – Cēsis – Valmiera – Valga (border of Estonia)
 Zemitāni – Skulte Railway
 Pļaviņas – Gulbene

Rail links with adjacent countries 

 Russia - yes
 Lithuania - yes
 Belarus - yes
 Estonia - yes

Airports 

Riga International Airport is the only major airport in Latvia, carrying around 5 million passengers annually. It is the largest airport in the Baltic states and has direct flights to over 80 destinations in 30 countries. It is also the main hub of airBaltic.

In the recent years airBaltic also operated from Liepāja International Airport as well as Ventspils International Airport but operations in both of these airports were ceased until 2017, when airBaltic relaunched flights from Riga to Liepaja.

Currently there are plans for further development in several regional airports, including Jūrmala Airport, Liepāja, Ventspils as well as Daugavpils International Airport.

Airfields 
As of 2003, there were a total of 51 airfields in Latvia, with 27 of them having paved runways.

Airports - with paved runways
total:
27 
2,438 to 3,047 m:
7
1,524 to 2,437 m:
2
914 to 1,523 m:
2
under 914 m:
16 (2003)

Airports - with unpaved runways
total:
24
2,438 to 3,047 m:
1
1,523 to 2,438 m:
2
914 to 1,523 m:
1
under 914 m:
20 (2003)

Ports and harbors 

Key ports are located in Riga (Freeport of Riga and Riga Passenger Terminal), Ventspils (Free port of Ventspils), and Liepāja (Port of Liepāja). Most transit traffic uses these and half the cargo is crude oil and oil products.

Waterways 
300 km (perennially navigable)

Pipelines 
crude oil 412 km; refined products 421 km; natural gas 1,097 km (2003)

Merchant marine 
total:
note:
includes some foreign-owned ships registered here as a flag of convenience: Germany 1, Greece 1, Ukraine 1 (2002 est.)
ships by type:
cargo ship 6, petroleum tanker 1, refrigerated cargo 2, roll-on/roll-off ship 1, short-sea/passenger 1

References

External links 
 History of railroad construction in Latvia
 Ministry of Transport of Republic of Latvia
 Transport in Latvia